Congolese people may refer to:
 People from the following countries and regions:
 Congo Basin, the sedimentary basin of the Congo River
 Republic of the Congo (Congo-Brazzaville), the former French Congo
 Democratic Republic of the Congo (Congo-Kinshasa), the former Belgian Congo
 Kongo people, a Bantu ethnic group in the Congo region

See also
 Congolese (disambiguation)
 List of Congolese people (disambiguation)
 List of Congolese people from the Democratic Republic of the Congo
 List of Congolese people from the Republic of the Congo